Prugiasco is a village and former municipality in the canton of Ticino, Switzerland.

In 2004 the municipality was merged with the other, neighboring municipalities Castro, Corzoneso, Dongio, Largario, Leontica, Lottigna, Marolta and Ponto Valentino to form a new and larger municipality Acquarossa.

Former municipalities of Ticino
Villages in Ticino